Doro AB, known as Doro, is a Swedish consumer electronics and assistive technology company focused on the elderly and improving the lives of seniors. Founded in 1974 in Sweden as a bold challenger to the state run telecoms monopoly, the company develops communications products and services designed primarily for the elderly, such as mobile phones and telecare systems. Doro operates a number of Alarm Receiving Centres in Sweden, Norway and UK.

Phones

Doro produce both clam and bar type feature phones which run Doro's own operating system, such as the Doro 6820 and the Doro 7060, and smartphones such as Doro 8080 and Doro 8100, which run on Android.  Its devices are designed with loud and clear sound, large separated keys and an assistance button that alerts emergency contacts if the user needs help.

Telecare
In August 2020 it acquired  Eldercare UK, a domiciliary care service provider in the North of England, for about £2.2 million. It had 109 full-time equivalent staff and monitored around 50,000 telecare connections.

In Dec 2021, Doro listed its Care assets in a separate company called Careium AB by distributing all shares in the wholly-owned subsidiary Careium AB to the shareholders of
Doro. 

After the spin-off of the care assets into Careium AB, Doro AB is once again a consumer technology company focused on developing services and products for seniors to live independent and fulfilling lives.

References

External links

Doro at OMX Nasdaq Nordic

Telecommunications companies of Sweden
Mobile phone manufacturers
Old age
Swedish brands
Companies based in Malmö